The Australian Football Hall of Fame was established in 1996, the Centenary year of the Australian Football League, to help recognise the contributions made to the sport of Australian rules football by players, umpires, media personalities, coaches and administrators. It was initially established with 136 inductees. As of 2022, this figure has grown to more than 300, including 32 "Legends".

While those involved in the game from its inception in 1858 are theoretically eligible, as of 2022, very few outside the elite leagues (the Victorian/Australian Football League (VFL/AFL), the West Australian Football League (WAFL), the South Australian National Football League (SANFL), the Challenge Cup of 1870–1876, the South Australian Interclub competition of 1870–1876, and the Victorian Football Association (VFA) of 1877–1896) have been inducted.

Selection

Selection criteria
A committee considers candidates on the basis of their ability, integrity, sportsmanship and character. While the number of games played, coached or umpired, or years of service in the case of administrators and media representatives, is a consideration, it alone does not determine eligibility.

Players must be retired from the game for at least five years before they become eligible for induction (extended from three years in 2015), while coaches, umpires, administrators and media representatives are eligible immediately upon retirement.

The committee considers candidates from all states and territories of Australia and from all Australian football competitions within Australia.

The following excerpt from the official Hall of Fame website highlights the main criteria used by the committee in selecting inductees to the Hall of Fame:
 The Committee shall consider a candidate's outstanding service and overall contribution to the game of Australian Football in determining a candidate's eligibility for induction into the Hall of Fame.
 Without limiting clause 5.1, the Committee may consider a candidate's individual record, ability, integrity, sportsmanship and character.
 The number of football games played, coached or umpired or the years of service provided shall only be a consideration and shall not be determinative in assessing a candidate's eligibility.
 A player, coach, umpire, administrator or media representative involved at any level of Australian Football may be eligible for induction into the Hall of Fame.
 Candidates shall be adjudged on the basis of their overall contribution to Australian Football, as opposed to one specific aspect.

In 2010, several amendments were made to the selection criteria, with key changes including:
 The maximum number of inductees in any single year reduced from eight to six, to increase the emphasis and honour for those inducted. This change was reversed in 2018.
 The requirement to induct a minimum of three recently retired players (retired within 10 years of each induction ceremony) reduced to a minimum of two, to ensure older players deserving of induction are represented in proportion. This requirement was removed completely in 2018.
 The requirement to have one inductee from the grouping of categories umpire/administrator/media every year changed to a minimum of one from this category every two years. In 2018, the requirement for people in the media or administration categories to have retired was removed.
 The Hall of Fame selection committee to be independent from the AFL Commission. The wording in the charter has been changed so that the selection committee recommends to the commission for "endorsement" rather than for "approval".
 Selectors would be appointed for an initial term of three years, with two further opportunities to be appointed for subsequent three year terms (total of nine years).
 At least 25 per cent of the selection committee to reside outside of Victoria.

Selection committee
The selection committee, as of 2021, comprises the chairman of the AFL Commission Richard Goyder, Paul Marsh (CEO of AFL Players Association), broadcasters (Michelangelo Rucci, Karen Lyon, Bruce McAvaney and Tania Armstrong), and former players (Ross Glendinning, Graham Cornes, Michael O'Loughlin and David Parkin) as well as Mark Genge (statistics/history consultant) and Patrick Keane (secretary).

Previous selectors have included Mike Fitzpatrick, Kevin Bartlett, Brendon Gale, historian Col Hutchinson, and broadcasters Harry Gordon, Geoff Christian, Caroline Wilson, Tim Lane, Mike Sheahan, Patrick Smith, Dennis Cometti and Jim Main.

Legends 
The Legends category is reserved for those who are deemed to have had a significant impact on the game of Australian rules football. Most "Legends" enshrined to date represent former players who played the majority or the whole of their career in the VFL/AFL, with three players in Barrie Robran, Jack Oatey (SANFL) and Merv McIntosh (WAFL) being selected for careers in their local state leagues. Being named as a "Legend" of the Australian Football Hall of Fame is the highest honour which can be bestowed onto an Australian footballer.

In 2010, several amendments to the Legends category were made to ensure the exclusivity and prestige of the Hall of Fame. Among them were:
 The Legends category remains exclusively for recognition of the most significant playing and coaching records 
 The number of Legends that can be part of the Hall of Fame remains at a maximum of 10 percent of the total inductees
 Criteria for elevating an inductee to Legend status requires that only ‘playing and coaching’ records be taken into account and not a candidate's overall contribution to the game outside of playing and coaching

Player inductees

Women inductees

Coach inductees

Umpires

 Brett Allen (VFL/AFL)
 Ken Aplin (SANFL)
 Henry "Ivo" Crapp (VFA, VFL, WAFL)
 Jeff Crouch (VFL)
 Bill Deller (VFL)
 Jack Elder (VFL)
 Tom McArthur (QAFL)
 Jack McMurray Sr. (VFA, VFL, NTFA)
 Jack McMurray Jr. (VFL)
 Ian Robinson (VFL)
 Rowan Sawers (VFL/AFL)
 Bob Scott (VFL)
 Ray Scott (WANFL)
 Bryan Sheehan (VFL/AFL)

Media 

 Norman Banks (Radio, Victoria)
 Harry Beitzel (Radio and print, Victoria)
 Alf Brown (Print, Victoria)
 Hugh Buggy (Print, Victoria)
 Ron Casey (Radio and television, Victoria)
 Tony Charlton (Radio and television, Victoria)
 Geoff Christian (Radio and print, Western Australia)
 Dennis Cometti (Radio and television, National)
 Hector DeLacy (Print, Victoria)
 Bruce McAvaney (Radio and television, National)
 Reginald Wilmot (Print, Victoria)

Administrators

 Bruce Andrew (ANFC)
 Max Basheer (SANFL)
 Charles Brownlow (VFL, ANFC)
 Ron Evans (AFL)
 Jack Hamilton (VFL)
 Bob Hammond (Adelaide, AFL)
 H. C. A. Harrison (VFA)
 Thomas Hill (Norwood, SANFL, ANFC)
 Sir Kenneth Luke (VFL)
 Likely 'Like' McBrien (South Melbourne, VFL)
 Bob McLean (Port Adelaide, SANFL)
 Dr William C. McClelland (VFL)
 Eric McCutchan (VFL)
 Ross Oakley (VFL/AFL)
 Pat Rodriguez (Claremont, WAFL, ANFC)
 Tom Wills

Pioneers 
 John Acraman
 Charles Kingston
 Richard Twopeny

Induction ceremony 
Every year there is a special Hall of Fame dinner to announce and welcome the new inductees to the Hall of Fame.

The Hall of Fame inductions started in Melbourne in 1996 to celebrate the VFL-AFL centenary season. Ceremonies have only been held outside of Victoria twice, once at Canberra in 2013 and once at Adelaide in 2017.

In 2020, due to the COVID-19 pandemic, the usual annual induction event was not held, and instead the new inductees and legend elevation were announced over four nights in a series of television shows.

Induction locations 

 1996: Melbourne, VIC
 1997: Melbourne, VIC
 1998: Melbourne, VIC
 1999: Melbourne, VIC
 2000: Melbourne, VIC
 2001: Melbourne, VIC
 2002: Melbourne, VIC
 2003: Melbourne, VIC
 2004: Melbourne, VIC
 2005: Melbourne, VIC
 2006: Melbourne, VIC 
 2007: Melbourne, VIC
 2008: Melbourne, VIC
 2009: Melbourne, VIC
 2010: Melbourne, VIC
 2011: Melbourne, VIC 
 2012: Melbourne, VIC – (Crown)
 2013: Canberra, ACT – (Old Parliament House)
 2014: Melbourne, VIC – (Crown)
 2015: Melbourne, VIC – (Crown)
 2016: Melbourne, VIC – (Crown)
 2017: Adelaide, SA – (Adelaide Oval)
 2018: Melbourne, VIC – (Crown)
 2019: Melbourne, VIC – (Crown)
 2020: Televised event only (COVID-19 pandemic)
 2021: Televised event only (COVID-19 pandemic)

Criticism

The Hall of Fame has been criticised by football writers and historians for being heavily biased towards figures from Victoria.

The initial selection committee was made up of 11 Victorians, one South Australian and one Western Australian, with the current selection committee being made up of six Victorians, two Western Australians and one South Australian. Of the 136 inaugural inductees into the Hall of Fame, 116 played substantial parts of their careers in Victoria, with eleven of the thirteen "Legends" from Victoria.

Criticism has also been slated at the under-representation of pioneers and other early stars of the game, as Adam Cardosi wrote in 2014:
 In 2018, the same criticism was levelled by ABC sport reporter James Coventry, who mentioned that over 60% of Legends inducted were either playing or coaching in 1969.

Declined inductions 
In 2021, Garry McIntosh and Adam Goodes both declined their nominations to be inducted into the Hall of Fame.

Goodes declined due to the lack of support and remedial action taken by the AFL in response to the racial abuse he had endured in his final years playing in the AFL,  while McIntosh stated that "he did not play the game for personal honours".

See also
 Australian Capital Territory Football Hall of Fame ACT (Est. 2006)
 New South Wales Football Hall of Fame NSW (Est. 2003)
 Northern Territory Football Hall of Fame NT (Est. 2010)
 Queensland Football Hall of Fame QLD (Est. 2008)
 South Australian Football Hall of Fame (Est. 2002)
 Tasmanian Football Hall of Fame (Est. 2005)
 West Australian Football Hall of Fame (Est. 2004)

References

External links
 Australian Football Hall of Fame official website

 
Australian Football League awards
Australian rules football museums and halls of fame
Sports organizations established in 1996
Halls of fame in Australia
1996 establishments in Australia